Brett Alan Harkins (born July 2, 1970) is an American former professional ice hockey left wing, who played for 18 years.  He played in  the National Hockey League in four stints with the Boston Bruins, Florida Panthers, and Columbus Blue Jackets between 1994 and 2002. As of January 2020, Harkins had served as a college-level scout for the Boston Bruins for over four seasons. 

Harkins is also the younger brother of Todd Harkins, who played for the Hartford Whalers and Calgary Flames.

Amateur career
As a youth, Harkins played in the 1981 Quebec International Pee-Wee Hockey Tournament along with his brother Todd, as a member of a minor ice hockey team from Cleveland.

Harkins attended St. Edward High School, located in Lakewood, Ohio, a western suburb of Cleveland.  He was an integral member of the 1986 Ohio High School Athletic Association State "big school" hockey champions.  However, he would leave St. Edward to attend St. Andrews High School north of Toronto before joining the Junior A Brockville Braves. He played in 38 games for Detroit Compuware Ambassadors of the NAJHL in 1988-89, scoring 69 points. He would play collegiately for Bowling Green State University from 1989 to 1993. In 2013, Harkins served as the head coach of the U-16 Midget Minor Cleveland Barons, assisted by Johnny Goebel, Jeremy Bronson, and his brother Donnie Harkins.

Professional career
Harkins was drafted in the seventh round, 133rd overall, by the New York Islanders in the 1989 NHL Entry Draft. He played 78 games in the National Hockey League with the Boston Bruins, Florida Panthers, and Columbus Blue Jackets. He last played professionally in the Swedish and Finnish leagues until his retirement 2008, ending his professional playing career with Rögle BK of HockeyAllsvenskan.

Career statistics

Regular season and playoffs

Awards and honors

References

External links

1970 births
Living people
Adirondack Red Wings players
American men's ice hockey left wingers
Boston Bruins players
Boston Bruins scouts
Bowling Green Falcons men's ice hockey players
Carolina Monarchs players
Cleveland Lumberjacks players
Columbus Blue Jackets players
Florida Panthers players
HIFK (ice hockey) players
Houston Aeros (1994–2013) players
Ice hockey players from Ohio
Jokerit players
New York Islanders draft picks
People from North Ridgeville, Ohio
Providence Bruins players
Rögle BK players
St. Edward High School (Lakewood, Ohio) alumni
Skellefteå AIK players
Syracuse Crunch players
Utah Rollerbees players